Billing railway station is a former railway station in Northamptonshire on the former Northampton and Peterborough Railway which connected Peterborough and Northampton. In 1846 the line, along with the London and Birmingham, became part of the London and North Western Railway.

At grouping in 1923 it became part of the London Midland and Scottish Railway.

The former service 

The service was from Peterborough to Northampton via Wellingborough. The station opened in 1845 and closed in 1952 to passengers.

References

External links
 http://www.subbrit.org.uk/sb-sites/stations/b/billing/index.shtml

Disused railway stations in Northamptonshire
Railway stations in Great Britain opened in 1845
Railway stations in Great Britain closed in 1952
Former London and Birmingham Railway stations
John William Livock buildings
West Northamptonshire District